The Savage is a 1917 American silent drama film starring Colleen Moore and Monroe Salisbury that is set in Canada and was directed by Rupert Julian. The film is presumed to be lost.

Story
Marie Louise returns home from finishing school, and catches the eye of Julio Sandoval, an emotional half-breed. She is engaged to Captain McKeever of the mounted police, but Sandoval wants her for himself. Finding her alone in the woods, the half-breed carries her to his cabin, but he is taken ill. Marie nurses him back to health, and when a rescue party arrives for her, she protects him. Back in town, Marie discovers McKeever has been taken prisoner by the outlaw Joe Bedotte. Julio goes to the rescue, losing his life in the process.

Cast
Ruth Clifford as Marie Louise
Colleen Moore as Lizette
Monroe Salisbury as Julio Sandoval
Allen Sears as Captain McKeever (credited as Allan Sears)
W. H. Bainbridge as Michael Montague
Arthur Tavares as Joe Bedotte
George Franklin as Baptiste
Duke R. Lee as Pierre (credited as Duke Lee)

Production
Shortly after Colleen Moore's arrival in Hollywood, the Triangle Film Corporation went through a reorganization with the departure of D. W. Griffith for Europe. Colleen's contract was with Griffith's studio, not Triangle, and so she found herself on contract with no projects. She found a part in Universal Bluebird's film The Savage and was given several weeks off from her contract to film her part. In the film, Colleen plays the part of Lizette, a half-breed like Julio. This would be one of several "exotic" roles Colleen would play during her career, including her part as a Persian in The Devil's Claim. After this film, Colleen went on to work at the Selig Polyscope Company.

Reception
Like many American films of the time, The Savage was subject to cuts by city and state film censorship boards. For example, the Chicago Board of Censors required cuts of the holdup and stealing of a letter, two scenes of the holdup of the officer at point of knife, binding the officer to the cabin wall, two closeups of men leering at the young woman after the intertitle "Give me a leetle kiss", and three closeups of the half-breed's face as he looks at the unconscious young woman in the cabin. The Board later made additional cuts in Reel 3 of all closeups of the half-breed leering at young woman at brookside, all but the first scene of the half-breed chasing her, the entire incident of half-breed laying unconscious woman on couch-bed including all closeups of man's passionate contortions and girl's scared face, intertitle "The white man's instinct struggles for supremacy", all other views of couple, and the intertitle "They'll kill you for this".

References

Bibliography
Jeff Codori (2012), Colleen Moore; A Biography of the Silent Film Star, McFarland Publishing, EBook .

External links

 
 Savage (1917), New York Times overview
  A novelization of The Savage.

American silent feature films
Films directed by Rupert Julian
Films set in Canada
1917 films
Lost American films
Universal Pictures films
American black-and-white films
Silent American drama films
1917 drama films
1917 lost films
Lost drama films
1910s American films